The 2015 Staffordshire Moorlands District Council election took place on 7 May 2015 to elect members of Staffordshire Moorlands District Council in England. This was on the same day as other local elections.

After the election, the composition of the council was:
Conservative 31
Independent 8
Labour 7
Liberal Democrat 2
Moorlands Democratic Alliance 2
UKIP 2

Ward results
The candidates highlighted in bold were elected to each ward.

References

 2015 election results 
 2011 election results

2015 English local elections
May 2015 events in the United Kingdom
2015
2010s in Staffordshire